2004 in Russian football was marked with Lokomotiv's second championship, Terek's cup victory, and national team playing at Euro 2004.

National team
Russia national football team participated in the final tournament of Euro 2004, where they finished last in group A. Later they started qualification for the 2006 FIFA World Cup. , Russia's 1–7 defeat from Portugal in a qualifier is their worst result in history.

 Russia score given first

Key
 H = Home match
 A = Away match
 N = Neutral ground
 F = Friendly
 EC = 2004 European Football Championship, Group A
 WCQ = 2006 FIFA World Cup, European Qualifying, Group 3

Leagues

Premier League

First Division

Terek Grozny and Tom Tomsk were promoted to the Premier League for the first time. Terek set a new record, scoring 100 points in a season.

Andrey Fedkov of Terek became the top goalscorer with 38 goals.

Second Division
The following clubs have earned promotion by winning tournaments in their respective Second Division zones:

 FC Torpedo Vladimir (West)
 FC Fakel Voronezh (Centre)
 FC Dynamo Stavropol (South)
 FC Ural Sverdlovsk Oblast (Ural-Povolzhye)
 FC Chkalovets-1936 Novosibirsk (East)

Prior to start of the 2005 season three clubs (Rotor Volgograd, Torpedo Vladimir, and Arsenal Tula) refused participation in the First Division, and two more clubs (Dynamo Stavropol and Chernomorets Novorossiysk) were denied licences. This made way for the runners-up of all five zones:

 FC Petrotrest Saint Petersburg (West)
 FC Avangard Kursk (Centre)
 FC Volgar-Gazprom Astrakhan (South)
 FC Lukoil Chelyabinsk (Ural-Povolzhye)
 FC Amur Blagoveshchensk (East)

Cups
The Russian Super Cup match between CSKA Moscow and Spartak Moscow was won by CSKA 3–1.

The Russian Cup was won by Terek Grozny, who beat Krylya Sovetov Samara in the final 1–0, with Andrey Fedkov scoring the only goal in the injury time. This was the first time the Cup was won by a team from the First Division.

UEFA club competitions

2003–04 UEFA Champions League
Lokomotiv Moscow qualified for the round of 16 of the 2003–04 UEFA Champions League, where they met AS Monaco. Lokomotiv won the home match 2–1, but lost on away goals after Monaco won the second leg 1–0.

2003–04 UEFA Cup
Spartak Moscow qualified for the third round of the 2003–04 UEFA Cup, where they lost 3–1 on aggregate to RCD Mallorca.

2004 UEFA Intertoto Cup
Spartak Moscow started in the first round of the UEFA Intertoto Cup 2004 and defeated FK Atlantas and NK Kamen Ingrad. Shinnik Yaroslavl started in the second round and defeated FK Teplice. Both Spartak and Shinnik were knocked out in the third round by Villarreal CF and UD Leiria, respectively.

2004–05 UEFA Champions League
CSKA Moscow were the only Russian club to play in the 2004–05 UEFA Champions League. They started in the second qualifying round and reached the group stage by beating PFC Neftchi and Rangers F.C. In Group H, they finished third behind Chelsea F.C. and Futebol Clube do Porto but ahead of Paris Saint-Germain F.C. The third position allowed CSKA to qualify for the 2004–05 UEFA Cup, a competition they eventually won.

2004–05 UEFA Cup
Terek Grozny (as the Russian Cup winners), Zenit Saint Petersburg and Rubin Kazan started in the second qualifying round of the 2004–05 UEFA Cup. Terek and Zenit qualified for the first round by defeating Lech Poznań and SV Pasching, respectively, while Rubin were knocked out by SK Rapid Wien. In the first round, Terek lost to FC Basel, and Zenit beat Red Star Belgrade and reached the group stage. In the group with Lille OSC, Sevilla FC, Alemannia Aachen, and AEK Athens FC, Zenit finished fourth and were eliminated.

References
 National team fixtures 
 League and cup results
 UEFA Champions League results: 2003–04  2004–05 
 UEFA Cup results: 2003–04 2004–05
 UEFA Intertoto Cup results 

 
Seasons in Russian football